In military terminology, a black site is a location at which an unacknowledged black operation or black project is conducted. A 2021 Associated Press news story defined black sites as "clandestine jails where prisoners generally are not charged with a crime and have no legal recourse, with no bail or court order."

China 

Black sites are widespread within China and a Chinese black site has been alleged to exist in Dubai by a former detainee. Black sites in China are also known as “black jails."

Egypt 
Black sites are used extensively by the Egyptian security services. During the Egyptian Crisis (2011–2014) hundreds of protesters alleged that torture occurred at these black sites. The Egyptian security service also operated black sites involved with the CIA’s counter-terror black site program.

Iran 
Rights groups have documented abuse in clandestine detention centers. Sources cited by CNN noted in 2023 that black-site torture appeared to increase during the Mahsa Amini protests.

Russia 

In Chechnya, gay men have allegedly been tortured at black sites by Chechen security forces. Gay men in other parts of Russia have been kidnapped and transported to sites in Chechnya, where over 100 have been tortured, and some killed. Chechen authorities have thwarted attempts by the Russian LGBT Network to help gay people in Chechnya escape to safe locations in Russia, and inhibited investigations by the Kremlin's human rights commissioner Tatyana Moskalkova. Despite protests in major Russian cities against the situation in Chechnya, Vladimir Putin, wanting to maintain good relations with Kadyrov, has denied that any abuses of homosexuals in Chechnya have occurred. Chechnya is arguably the most homophobic area in Russia, with 95% of its population adhering to Orthodox (Sunni) Islam. It remains the only district of Russia where homosexuality is outlawed and punishable with jail time.

Turkey

United States  

CIA controlled black sites are used by the U.S. government in its War on Terror to detain enemy combatants.
US President George W. Bush acknowledged the existence of secret prisons operated by the CIA during a speech on September 6, 2006. A claim that the black sites existed was made by The Washington Post in November 2005 and before this by human rights NGOs.

A European Union (EU) report adopted on February 14, 2007, by a majority of the European Parliament (382 MEPs voting in favor, 256 against and 74 abstaining) stated the CIA operated 1,245 flights and that it was not possible to contradict evidence or suggestions that secret detention centers where prisoners have been tortured were operated in Poland and Romania. After denying the fact for years, Poland confirmed in 2014 that it has hosted black sites.

In January 2012, Poland's Prosecutor General's office initiated investigative proceedings against Zbigniew Siemiątkowski, the former Polish intelligence chief. Siemiątkowski was charged with facilitating the alleged CIA detention operation in Poland, where foreign suspects may have been tortured in the context of the War on Terror. The involvement of Leszek Miller, Poland's Prime Minister from 2001 to 2004, is also considered possible.

A 2022 United Press International story cited former Polish President Aleksander Kwaśniewski as admitting in 2014 that his country had provided “a quiet location” for the CIA to operate a black site to torture accused Sept. 11, 2001, terrorists.

See also

 Ain Aouda secret prison
 Camp 1391
 Enhanced interrogation techniques
 Forced disappearance
 Homan Square facility
 LGBT rights in Chechnya
 Political prisoner
 Prisoner of war
 Rendition
 Torture chamber
 United Nations Convention Against Torture

References

External links

Black sites
Penal imprisonment
Detention centers for extrajudicial prisoners of the United States
Imprisonment and detention
Torture
Chechnya